

Tournament 

Kisei (Go)
1993 in go